The 1908 South Dakota gubernatorial election was held on November 3, 1908. Incumbent Republican Governor Coe I. Crawford opted to run for the U.S. Senate rather than run for re-election. State Senator Robert S. Vessey narrowly won the Republican primary over former State Representative John L. Browne and advanced to the general election, where he faced the Democratic nominee, former Governor Andrew E. Lee. Though Vessey's performance was significantly reduced from Crawford's performance in 1906, he still defeated Lee by a wide margin.

Primary elections
Primary elections were held on June 9, 1908.

Democratic primary

Candidates
Andrew E. Lee, former Governor

Results

Republican primary

Candidates
John L. Browne, State Representative
Robert S. Vessey, State Senator

Results

Socialist primary

Candidates
J. C. Knapp

Results

General election

Results

References

1908
South Dakota
Gubernatorial
November 1908 events